Venkatesh Prabhu Kasthuri Raja (born 28 July 1983), known professionally as Dhanush, is an Indian actor, producer, director, lyricist and playback singer who predominantly works in Tamil cinema. Having starred in 46 films over his career, his accolades include four National Film Awards (two as actor and two as producer), 14 SIIMA Awards, nine Vijay Awards, seven Filmfare Awards South, five Vikatan Awards, five Edison Awards and a Filmfare Award. He has been included in the Forbes India Celebrity 100 list six times, which is based on the earnings of Indian celebrities.

Dhanush's first film was Thulluvadho Ilamai, a 2002 coming-of-age film directed by his father, Kasthuri Raja. He achieved further success in Polladhavan (2007) and Yaaradi Nee Mohini (2008), both of which were critically acclaimed and commercially successful. His role as a rooster fight jockey in Aadukalam (2010) won him the National Film Award for Best Actor and the Filmfare Award for Best Actor – Tamil. He continued success with films including Maryan (2013), Velaiilla Pattadhari (2014), Anegan (2015), Kodi (2016), Vadachennai (2018), Asuran (2019), Thiruchitrambalam (2022) and Vaathi (2023). Vadachennai emerged as the highest-grossing A-rated Tamil film of all time, while Thiruchitrambalam and Vaathi entered the 100 Crore Club within a month of their release. During the 2010s, he also starred in the action films Maari (2015), Maari 2 (2018), and Velaiilla Pattadhari 2 (2017).

In 2011, Dhanush's popular song "Why This Kolaveri Di" from the romantic psychological thriller film 3 (2012) became the first Indian music video to cross 100 million views on YouTube. He made his Bollywood debut with Aanand L. Rai's Raanjhanaa (2013). His performance as an obsessive one-sided lover in the film won him the Filmfare Award for Best Male Debut in addition to a nomination for the Filmfare Award for Best Actor. Dhanush produces films through his production company, Wunderbar Films, and he made his directorial debut with Pa Paandi (2017). His song "Rowdy Baby" from Maari 2 became one of the most-viewed Indian songs of all time. It is the only South Indian video song to reach 1 billion views on YouTube. Dhanush won his second National Film Award for Best Actor for Asuran (2019).

Early and personal life
Dhanush was born as Venkatesh Prabhu Kasthuri Raja on 28 July 1983 to a Tamil film director and producer, Kasthuri Raja, and mother, Vijayalakshmi, in Madras, Tamil Nadu. Initially he wished to go to a school of hotel management and become a chef. However his brother, director Selvaraghavan, pressured him to become an actor.

Dhanush married Aishwarya, Rajinikanth's eldest daughter on 18 November 2004. They have two sons, Yatra and Linga, who were born in 2006 and 2010 respectively. The couple announced their separation on 17 January 2022.

He is an ardent devotee of Lord Shiva and gave his two sons Shaivite names. Dhanush is a vegetarian.

Acting career

2002–2010: Career beginnings 
Venkatesh Prabhu adopted the screen name "Dhanush" after being inspired by the fictional covert operation from Kuruthipunal (1995). He debuted in the 2002 teen drama film Thulluvadho Ilamai, directed by his father Kasthuri Raja, which became a sleeper hit. He then appeared in his brother Selvaraghavan's first directorial venture, the romantic psychological thriller Kaadhal Kondein in 2003. The film portrayed Dhanush as a mentally-disturbed youth, Vinodh, who yearned for the love of his friend, eventually turning possessive of her. Upon release, the film opened to critical acclaim and proved to be a major commercial success, eventually becoming Dhanush's breakthrough in Tamil cinema. The film also fetched him his first nomination for the Filmfare Award for Best Actor – Tamil. His next film was the romantic comedy Thiruda Thirudi (2003), a critical and commercial success.

In 2004, Dhanush appeared in Pudhukottaiyilirundhu Saravanan and Sullan. Later, he also appeared in Dreams, another film panned by critics. The film was directed by his father, like their previous ventures. In 2005, Dhanush appeared in Devathaiyai Kanden and in the same year, he also worked on Balu Mahendra's Adhu Oru Kana Kaalam.  In 2006, Dhanush worked under his brother in their gangster film Pudhupettai. The film, about a young man's journey from street urchin to gangster received critical acclaim, with Dhanush's performance receiving major praise. He received his second nomination for the Filmfare Award for Best Actor – Tamil for his performance in the film. Dhanush went on to star in the commercial entertainer Thiruvilaiyaadal Aarambam opposite Shriya Saran.

Dhanush's first release of 2007, Parattai Engira Azhagu Sundaram did not do well at the box office. The film was a remake of the successful Kannada language film Jogi (2005). However, his second film Polladhavan was released during Diwali 2007. Polladhavan was based on the 1948–Italian neorealist film Bicycle Thieves and Dhanush's performance was appreciated.

The following year, the remake of a Telugu film directed by his brother formed the plot line for Dhanush's next film directed by debutant Mithran Jawahar, later titled Yaaradi Nee Mohini. The romantic comedy proved to be a major critical and commercial success, thus earning Dhanush his third nomination for the Filmfare Award for Best Actor – Tamil. He later appeared in a cameo appearance, for his father-in-law Rajinikanth's venture Kuselan. His subsequent venture was Suraj's Padikathavan, which was released in January 2009. His performance was praised and well received. His next two films Kutty and Uthama Puthiran, were both collaborations with director Mithran Jawahar.

The song "Un Mele Aasaidhaan" from the action-adventure film Aayirathil Oruvan, which featured him alongside his wife Aishwarya Rajinikanth, won him his first Filmfare Award for Best Male Playback Singer – Tamil.

2011–2014: Critical success

Dhanush's first release in 2011, which he had shot for over three years, was Aadukalam, marking his second collaboration with Vetrimaran. Dhanush played the role of a local cockfighter and described the venture as his "dream project" during production. The film gained widespread critical acclaim and won six awards at the 58th National Film Awards, with Dhanush receiving the National Film Award for Best Actor, becoming the youngest actor to win the award. He also won his first Filmfare Award for Best Actor – Tamil for his performance in the film. Dhanush appeared in an extended guest appearance in Subramania Siva's Seedan. His next two ventures were the action films, Mappillai, a remake of his father-in-law's same-titled 1989 film and Venghai, by Hari, which received mixed reviews but was a commercial success.

Dhanush's next film, Mayakkam Enna, in which he once again collaborated with his brother, casting him with Richa Gangopadhyay, received positive reviews. His only release in 2012 was the romantic psychological thriller 3, directed by his wife, Aishwarya Rajinikanth with co-star Shruti Haasan. The film emerged as a critical and commercial success, majorly due to the popularity of the song "Why This Kolaveri Di". The song quickly became viral, the first video from India to gain 100 million YouTube views. The film won him his second consecutive Filmfare Award for Best Actor – Tamil and his second Filmfare Award for Best Male Playback Singer – Tamil. 

In 2013, he appeared in Maryan opposite Parvathy, which emerged as an above-average grosser at the box office, but was critically acclaimed, thus earning Dhanush his sixth nomination for the Filmfare Award for Best Actor – Tamil, in addition to fetching him the Filmfare Award for Best Actor (Critics) – Tamil. His next release was Naiyaandi, directed by A. Sarkunam, which did not make any notable impact at the box office. He made his debut in Bollywood with the film Raanjhanaa, directed by Aanand L.Rai opposite Sonam. The film was released on 21 June 2013 with the Tamil dubbed version Ambikapathy releasing a week later. This film had background score composed by A. R. Rahman and received mixed reviews from critics, and it grossed over 94 crore rupees worldwide.
 
Dhanush's first film of 2014 was the comedy-drama Velaiilla Pattadhari, which was also his 25th film and was directed by Velraj. It received positive reviews from critics and was a commercial success, ranking among the highest-grossing Tamil films of 2014. Dhanush won his third Filmfare Award for Best Actor – Tamil for his performance in the film. The Telugu dubbed version, Raghuvaran B. Tech, was also a success. 

His next release was Shamitabh (2015), which was also his second Hindi film directed by R. Balki. It opened to highly positive reviews and was praised for the concept, but failed at the box office. His next film Anegan, a psychological thriller directed by K. V. Anand, which received positive reviews and became a box office success. The film earned Dhanush his eighth nomination for the Filmfare Award for Best Actor – Tamil.

2015–present: Experimental projects
Dhanush's next release in 2015 was the action comedy Maari, featuring Kajal Aggarwal, Robo Shankar and Vijay Yesudas. Directed by Balaji Mohan and composed by Anirudh Ravichander, it was released worldwide on 17 July 2015 and received mixed reviews. He also appeared in Thanga Magan, directed by Velraj with Samantha Ruth Prabhu, Amy Jackson, K. S. Ravikumar and Raadhika. In 2016, Dhanush appeared Thodari, which was an action thriller film set on a train and Kodi, a political action thriller, which earned him his ninth nomination for the Filmfare Award for Best Actor – Tamil.

He played a cameo in his directorial debut Power Paandi, which released on 14 April 2017. Velaiilla Pattadhari 2, directed by his sister-in-law Soundarya Rajinikanth, was his first film of 2017 as a lead actor. He penned the story and dialogues for movie. as well as producing it. It was one of the highest-grossing Tamil films of 2017. His films Vadachennai and Maari 2, a sequel to Maari, were released in 2018. Vadachennai was highly praised by critics and emerged as the highest-grossing A-rated Tamil film of all time. For his performance in the film, Dhanush also jointly won the Filmfare Award for Best Actor – Tamil (tying with Vijay Sethupathi for '96), his fourth win in the category. Maari 2 received mixed reviews upon release and was a moderate success at the box office. Dhanush's first international film, titled The Extraordinary Journey of the Fakir, released in 2019 worldwide and was a commercial failure. His next 2019 release, Asuran, was praised by critics for its gritty portrayal of land and caste violence and became a box office success, entering the 100 Crore Club for grossing ₹100 crore within a month of its release. Asuran won Dhanush his second National Film Award for Best Actor. His next release, a romantic thriller titled Enai Noki Paayum Thota was released on 29 November 2019 after several delays due to financial problems and it received mixed reviews upon release.

Dhanush's first 2020 release, on Pongal, was the martial arts action film Pattas, directed by R. S. Durai Senthilkumar, in which he played a double role. The film received positive reviews. Dhanush joined the ensemble cast of Chris Evans, Ryan Gosling and Ana de Armas in Russo brothers Netflix produced film The Gray Man.

Dhanush's first 2021 role was his starring role in Karnan, directed by Mari Selvaraj, and featuring Lal, Natarajan Subramaniam, Yogi Babu, Rajisha Vijayan, Gouri Kishan, Lakshmi Priyaa Chandramouli alongside him. The film released on 9 April, to critical acclaim. For his performance in the film, Dhanush received his eleventh nomination for the Filmfare Award for Best Actor – Tamil. His next project was the black comedy gangster film, Jagame Thandhiram, written and directed by Karthik Subbaraj, which released on 18 June 2021. It also featured Joju George (in his Tamil debut), Aishwarya Lekshmi (in her Tamil debut), and James Cosmo. It received mixed-to-positive reviews from critics. He also starred in Aanand L. Rai's August 2021 film Atrangi Re, co-starring Akshay Kumar and Sara Ali Khan.

In 2022, Dhanush starred in Thiruchitrambalam, directed by Mithran Jawahar, and featuring Nithya Menen, Priya Bhavani Shankar, Rashi Kanna, Bharathiraja, Prakash Raj, Munishkanth, all alongside Dhanush. The film released on 18 August, 2022,  in theatres. It went to become the highest-grossing film in his career.

Music
Dhanush is a singer, generally for his own films. He was introduced as a playback singer in Pudhukottaiyilirundhu Saravanan, by its composer Yuvan Shankar Raja and collaborated again with him in his brother Selvaraghavan's directorial, Pudhupettai. He sang further numbers in Selvaraghavan's films Aayirathil Oruvan and Mayakkam Enna; the former, which featured him alongside his wife Aishwarya Rajinikanth.

"Why This Kolaveri Di" was released on YouTube in 2011 as part of the soundtrack to the film 3, the directorial debut of Aishwarya Dhanush. The song became the most-searched video in India. Anirudh Ravichander was the soundtrack composer for the film and Dhanush wrote much of the lyrics. He has also sung "No Problem" in the Kannada film Vajrakaya, which earned him a nomination for the Filmfare Award for Best Male Playback Singer – Kannada, and "Thikka" in the Telugu film Thikka.

Discography

Lyrics

Other work
Dhanush worked with WWF India to support Earth Hour 2012. In August 2013, Dhanush was signed by Perfetti India Ltd. as their brand ambassador for Center Fresh chewing gum.

He has made his directorial debut with the oomedy-drama Pa Paandi (2017), which earned him his first Filmfare Award for Best Director – Tamil.

Accolades

Dhanush has won and received several nominations at the National Film Award, Filmfare Awards and Vijay Awards ceremony. He won the National Film Award for Best Actor, twice, in 2011 and 2021, for his films with Vetrimaaran, Aadukalam and Asuran.

References

External links

 
 

Living people
Tamil male actors
Tamil playback singers
Best Actor National Film Award winners
Male actors in Hindi cinema
Singers from Chennai
21st-century Indian male actors
Filmfare Awards South winners
Indian male playback singers
Male actors from Chennai
South Indian International Movie Awards winners
Zee Cine Awards winners
International Indian Film Academy Awards winners
Filmfare Awards winners
Tamil film poets
1983 births